The 1998 Swedish Golf Tour, known as the Telia Tour for sponsorship reasons, was the 15th season of the Swedish Golf Tour, a series of professional golf tournaments held in Sweden, Denmark, Norway and Finland.

A number of the tournaments also featured on the 1998 Challenge Tour.

Schedule
The season consisted of 14 events played between June and October.

Order of Merit

References

Swedish Golf Tour